Limnonectes nitidus (common name: Tanah Rata wart frog) is a species of frog in the family Dicroglossidae. It is endemic to Peninsular Malaysia where it is only known from the Cameron Highlands and Fraser's Hill, both in Pahang state.

Limnonectes nitidus inhabits montane rainforests. These frogs congregate and breed in permanently wet seepage areas.

Limnonectes nitidus has a small range, and its habitat is threatened by habitat loss caused by development for agriculture and tourism.

References

External links
Amphibian and Reptiles of Peninsular Malaysia - Limnonectes nitidus

nitidus
Amphibians of Malaysia
Endemic fauna of Malaysia
Taxonomy articles created by Polbot
Amphibians described in 1932